Lipogomphus is a genus of velvet water bugs in the family Hebridae. There are at least four described species in Lipogomphus.

Species
These four species belong to the genus Lipogomphus:
 Lipogomphus accola (Drake & Chapman, 1958)
 Lipogomphus brevis (Champion, 1898)
 Lipogomphus lacuniferus Berg, 1879
 Lipogomphus leucosticta (Champion, 1898)

References

Further reading

 
 
 
 

Articles created by Qbugbot
Hebroidea
Gerromorpha genera